Reliquiae are a German band which plays rock styled medieval music and folk music. They have played at the Wacken festival and other festivals.

Discography 
 2009: Prolog (Mini-Album) 
 2011: Audi, Vide, Tace album 
 2012: Am Teich (Remix-EP)
 2013: Pandora album
 2016: Winter album

References

German musical groups